Ridaküla is a village in Kadrina Parish, Lääne-Viru County, in northern Estonia. Ridaküla is bordered by the Tallinn–Tapa–Narva railway to the southeast and the Valgejõgi River to the southwest.

Heritage Sites Nearby 
If you ever visit Ridaküla remember to stop by  Unesco world heritage sites nearby. The nearest heritage site is Struve Geodetic Arc in Belarus at a distance of 21 mi (or 34 km). Tapa, Kadrina, Ambla, Tamsalu and Vosu are the other places you would want to visit.

References

Villages in Lääne-Viru County